KLZA (101.3 FM, "Sunny 101.3") is a radio station licensed to serve Falls City, Nebraska, United States. The station is owned by KNZA, Inc.

KLZA broadcasts an adult contemporary music format.

History
This station received its original construction permit from the Federal Communications Commission on March 6, 1997.  The new station was assigned the KLZA call sign by the FCC on April 11, 1997.  KLZA received its license to cover from the FCC on October 16, 1998.

References

External links
KLZA official website

LZA
Mainstream adult contemporary radio stations in the United States
Radio stations established in 1998
Richardson County, Nebraska